United Nations Security Council Resolution 27, adopted on August 1, 1947, called for the opposing Netherlands and Indonesian Republicans in the Indonesian National Revolution to lay down their arms and to allow a peaceful mediation of the conflict.

No vote was taken on the draft resolution as a whole, only in parts.

See also
 List of United Nations Security Council Resolutions 1 to 100 (1946–1953)

References
 Text of the Resolution at undocs.org

External links
 

 0027
Indonesian National Revolution
 0027
 0027
1947 in Indonesia
1947 in the Netherlands
August 1947 events